James Rossi (April 12, 1936 – September 3, 2005) was an American cyclist. He competed at the 1956 Summer Olympics and the 1960 Summer Olympics. He was the National Champion from 1959–1963.

References

External links
 

1936 births
2005 deaths
American male cyclists
Olympic cyclists of the United States
Cyclists at the 1956 Summer Olympics
Cyclists at the 1960 Summer Olympics
Cyclists from Chicago
Pan American Games medalists in cycling
Pan American Games gold medalists for the United States
Pan American Games silver medalists for the United States
American track cyclists
Cyclists at the 1963 Pan American Games
Medalists at the 1963 Pan American Games